

Book
Edward T. Hall#The Hidden Dimension

Film
Richard Robbins (composer)#Filmography

Music
Artrosis#Albums